Tiffany Michelle Brissette (born December 26, 1974) is an American nurse and former child actress. She is best known for her role as Vicki the Robot (also known as Vicki Lawson) on the syndicated American sitcom Small Wonder, which aired from 1985 to 1989.

Career
Born in Paradise, California, Brissette first appeared in the 1983 film Heart Like a Wheel opposite Bonnie Bedelia and Beau Bridges. She then had a guest role on Webster before landing the role of V.I.C.I. the Robot in the syndicated series Small Wonder in 1985. After the series was canceled in 1989, Brissette continued acting, appearing in Parker Lewis Can't Lose as well as an unsold television pilot entitled  Beanpole. In 1990, she voiced Wrenifred Brown the bird in the two-dimensional computer animated video Why Christmas Trees Aren't Perfect, which is based on the book of the same name and stars the voice talents of Jodi Benson, Tony Melendez, and Ray Benson. Her last professional acting role was in 1991 in Christopher Knopf's television series Equal Justice.

In 2007, Brissette was working as a registered nurse for Boulder Community Hospital in Boulder, Colorado.

Filmography

Award nominations

References

External links

Tiffany Brissette's Biography

1974 births
20th-century American actresses
Actresses from Boulder, Colorado
Actresses from California
American child actresses
American film actresses
American nurses
American television actresses
American voice actresses
American women nurses
Living people
People from Paradise, California
Westmont College alumni
21st-century American women